Ángel Picazo (1 July 1917 – 22 October 1998) was a Spanish film actor. He appeared in 30 films between 1947 and 1980. He was born in Murcia, Spain and died in Madrid, Spain.

Selected filmography
 The Call of Africa (1952)
 Two Degrees of Ecuador (1953)
 An Impossible Crime (1954)
 Two Paths (1954)
 Franco, ese hombre (1964)
 That Man in Istanbul (1965)

External links

1917 births
1998 deaths
Spanish male film actors
Deaths from cancer in Spain
20th-century Spanish male actors